The Office of the Inspector General (OIG) for the Department of Justice (DOJ) is responsible for conducting nearly all of the investigations of DOJ employees and programs. The office has several hundred employees, reporting to the Inspector General. Michael E. Horowitz has held the post since 2012.

The OIG conducts independent investigations, audits, inspections, and special reviews of United States Department of Justice personnel and programs. The OIG completes these tasks to detect and deter waste, fraud, abuse, and misconduct, and to promote integrity, economy, efficiency, and effectiveness in Department of Justice operations.   The Office of the Inspector General (OIG) consists of a front office, which comprises the Inspector General, the Deputy Inspector General, the Office of the General Counsel, and six major components. Each division is headed by an Assistant Inspector General.

The OIG's investigative jurisdiction includes all allegations of criminal wrongdoing or administrative misconduct by DOJ employees, except for allegations of misconduct that "relate to the exercise of the authority of an attorney to investigate, litigate, or provide legal advice," which are referred to the DOJ Office of Professional Responsibility (OPR) unless the allegation concerns attorneys who work for OPR or the investigation is criminal in nature.

History of Inspectors General

See also 

 List of United States federal law enforcement agencies

References

External links 
 

Justice Office of the Inspector General, Department of
Inspector General